Cams Card Shark (1991-2020) is an American champion standardbred horse. His sire (father) was Cam Fella, who earned more than $2 million during his racing career, and his dam (mother) was Jef's Magic Trick, who only earned $28,340 during her career. He was named the 1994 American Horse of the Year by the United States Trotting Association and held the then-record of most money earned by a Standardbred horse in a single year. During his two years of competition until his retirement in 1994, Cam's Card Shark had 20 wins, earning more than $2.4 million.

Early life

Racing career 
As a 2-Year Old in 1993 Cam's Card Shark won the Lou Babic Memorial and five of his fourteen starts.

In 1994 Cam's Card Shark won 15 of 18 starts. He won the Meadowlands Pace in 1:50 and also secured wins in the North America Cup, Berry's Creek, Messenger Stakes, New Jersey Classic, the Adios Pace, James B. Dancer Memorial, Art Rooney Pace and the Miller Memorial.

The Messenger was the first leg of the Triple Crown in 1994 and Cam's Card Shark won in a stakes record 1:51. He then won the Meadowlands Pace in 1:50. In the Adios Pace he won by 3 1/4 lengths running his last half mile in 54 1/5 seconds. Before the elimination to the Little Brown Jug Cam's Card Shark was scratched for lameness and never raced again.

He had become the leading single-season money-winner of all time, earning $2,264,714 from 18 starts in 1994 with 15 wins. He was the fourth pacer in the history of harness racing to earn more than $2 million in one season. Cam's Card Shark was voted Harness Horse of the Year for 1994.

Retirement 
Cam's Card Shark was elected to the Hall of Fame. At the time of his election he had sired the winners of $68 million including five $2m winners. His progeny include Holborn Hanover who has the fastest race mile in history, three Little Brown Jug winners including Bettor's Delight and other renown horses including Royalflush Hanover, Four Starzzz Shark, Million Dollar Cam and Shark Gesture. His son Bettor's Delight has extended the sire line that began through Meadow Skipper and his son Most Happy Fella.

In April 2012, Cam's Card Shark had to get scrotal hernia surgery, and part of his testicle and his small intestine had to be removed. Cam's Card Shark died in July 2020.

Pedigree

References

Further reading
 
 
 
 

1991 racehorse births
American Standardbred racehorses
American Champion harness horses
Harness Horse of the Year winners
Harness racing in the United States
Messenger Stakes winners
United States Harness Racing Hall of Fame inductees